The Taponga River, an inland perennial river of the Goulburn Broken catchment, part of the Murray-Darling basin, is located in the lower South Eastern Highlands bioregion,  Alpine and Northern Country/North Central regions of the Australian state of Victoria. It flows from the northwestern slopes of the Australian Alps, north and joins with the Big River.

Course
The river descends  over its  course.

Etymology
The name of the river is derived from the Aboriginal Taungurung word tap, meaning a bronzewing pigeon. The river has variously been called the Wild Dog River and the Right Hand Branch of the Big River.

Recreation
There are usually some small river blackfish.

There is no booking system for the camp site.

See also

References

External links

Goulburn Broken catchment
Rivers of Hume (region)
Murray-Darling basin
Victorian Alps